Steppuhn is a Germanized Lithuanian family name, originating from East Prussia, and it may refer to:

  (1877–1955), German general
  (born 1950), German politician (Christian Democratic Union (CDU))
  (born 1962), German politician (Social Democratic Party of Germany (SPD))
 Elisabet Boehm or Elisabet Steppuhn (1859–1943), German feminist and writer
 Fyodor Stepun or Friedrich Steppuhn (1884–1965), Russian-German writer, philosopher, historian and sociologist
  (1827-1907), German landowner and member of the Reichstag, father of Elisabet Boehm.

Surnames of Lithuanian origin
German people of Lithuanian descent
East Prussia
German-language surnames